Prokudin is a Russian masculine surname, its feminine counterpart is Prokudina. It may refer to
Aleksei Prokudin (born 1982), Russian football player
Oleksandr Prokudin, Ukrainian governor of Kherson Oblast
Pavel Prokudin (born 1966), Prime Minister of Transnistria
Sergey Prokudin-Gorsky (1863–1944), Russian chemist and photographer

Russian-language surnames